The Supreme Constitutional Court (Al Mahkama Al Dustūrīya El ‘Ulyā) is an independent judicial body in Egypt, located in the Cairo suburb of Maadi.

The Supreme Constitutional Court is the highest judicial power. It alone undertakes the judicial control in respect of the constitutionality of the laws and regulations and undertakes the interpretation of the legislative texts in the manner prescribed by law. In addition, the court is empowered to settle competence disputes between the judicial and the administrative courts.

History 
The establishment of the Supreme Constitutional Court goes back to the argument which was raised over the right of courts or any judicial bodies to pronounce on the constitutionality of the laws issued by the Legislative power. Such a judicial argument has been advocated in arguing that, considering the issue of the constitutionality of laws is included in the competence of the courts, it does not therefore prejudice in any way the principle of separation of powers. The argument of such a party was, however, based on a basic assertion that discussing this issue is but a sheer legal act as the core and crux of this matter is represented in interpreting the laws which were appealed against as unconstitutional, a matter of a legal nature in the first place. Indeed, the Egyptian legislator adopted this approach when the court was established in 1969 and was then called the Supreme Court entrusted to censoring the laws' constitutionality. The aforementioned court was existent till its replacement with the SCC in 1979.

Structure 
The establishment of the Court has been stipulated in the body of the Egyptian Constitution in 1971. Judges are appointed for life by the president, with mandatory retirement at the age of 70. Articles 174 to 178 talked about this court, its competences and its staff. And, according to Article 174, the Court is an independent judicial authority whose headquarters is in Cairo. The SCC is alone responsible for censoring the constitutionality of the laws and regulations and it assumes interpreting legislative texts. By virtue of constitutional provisions, the law No. 48/1979, known as that of the Supreme Court, has been issued. Article No. 25 of this law has specified the competences of this court as follows:

 To censor the constitutionality of the laws and regulations.
 To decide on the disputes over the competent authority among the judicial bodies or authorities of judicial competence.
 To decide on the disputes that might take place as to carrying out two final contradictory rulings where one of the aforementioned rulings has been issued by one of the judicial body and the other by another body of judicial competence.
 And by virtue of the provision of Article No. 26 of the aforementioned law, the SCC alone has the power to interpret the laws issued by the Legislative Authority and the decrees issued by the Head of the State in case of any divergence as regards their implementation.
The SCC can, in all cases, judge on the unconstitutionality of any provision in a law or a regulation being presented to it when assuming its competences and connected to the dispute presented before it.

The president of the Supreme Court was the head of the Presidential Election Commission that supervised and ran the country's first multi-candidate presidential elections in 2005.

Building
The new building (completed in the year 2000) was designed by Ahmed Mito, then a young Egyptian architect. It is an unusual contemporary instance of Egyptian Revival architecture, a style more popular in the nineteenth century. Covering 4000 m2, it also includes counseling halls, a multi purpose hall for 451 people, offices, a library, a museum, 33 consultants' offices and a large atrium that rises up to 18 meters and is covered by a dome.

See also
Constitution
Constitutionalism
Constitutional economics
Jurisprudence
Judiciary
Rule of law
Rule According to Higher Law
Tahani al-Gebali

References

External links

Official website
Constitutional Courts after the Arab Spring
Supreme Constitutional Court, Egypt State Information Service
Photos of SCC building, 2008
Egypt: Roadmap to the presidency, Gamal Essam El-Din, Al-Ahram Weekly, July 25, 2009, about Farouk Sultan's appointment
Egypt's New Chief Justice, Clark Lombardi, Comparative Constitutions, September 30, 2009

1979 establishments in Egypt
Buildings and structures in Cairo
Egypt
Judiciary of Egypt
Egyptian Revival architecture
Egypt
Courts and tribunals established in 1979